This is a list of heavy metal drummers.

A 
 Sal Abruscato (Life of Agony, Type O Negative)
 Chris Adler (Lamb of God)
 Steven Adler (Guns N' Roses, Slash)
 Tommy Aldridge (Black Oak Arkansas, Whitesnake)
 Tim Alexander (Primus)
 Rick Allen (Def Leppard)
 Bill Andrews (Death, Massacre)
 Seven Antonopoulos (Leaves' Eyes, Atrocity)
 Carmine Appice (Beck, Bogert & Appice, Cactus, King Kobra)
 Vinny Appice (Dio, Black Sabbath, Heaven & Hell)
 Steve Asheim (Deicide)
 Nick Augusto (Trivium)

B 
 Laurens Bakker (Picture)
 Frankie Banali (Quiet Riot, W.A.S.P.)
 Brandon Barnes (Rise Against)
 Angel Bartolotta (Genitorturers, Dope)
 Roger J. Beaujard (Mortician)
 Chuck Behler (Megadeth)
 Charlie Benante (Anthrax, Stormtroopers of Death)
 Noah Bernardo (P.O.D.)
 Bobby Blotzer (Ratt, Contraband)
 Jan Axel Blomberg (Mayhem)
 Mike Bordin (Faith No More, Ozzy Osbourne)
 Jamie Borger (Talisman, Treat)
 Paul Bostaph (Slayer, Testament)
 Stef Broks (Exivious, Textures)
 Mike Browning (Morbid Angel)
 Dirk Bruinenberg (Elegy, Adagio)
 Ronald Bruner Jr. (Suicidal Tendencies, The Temptations)
 Ivan Busic (Dr. Sin, Ultraje a Rigor, Eduardo Araújo)

C 
 Will Calhoun (Living Colour)
 Danny Carey (Tool)
 Eric Carr (Kiss)
 Michael Cartellone (Accept, Damn Yankees)
 Randy Castillo (Mötley Crüe, Ozzy Osbourne)
 Deen Castronovo (Ozzy Osbourne, Black Sabbath, Steve Vai, Hardline)
 Igor Cavalera (Sepultura, Cavalera Conspiracy)
 Jim Chaffin (The Crucified, Deliverance)
 Dave Chavarri (Ill Niño, Soulfly)
 Jonny Chops (Wednesday 13, Trashlight Vision, Anti-Product)
 Richard Christy (Charred Walls of the Damned, Death, Iced Earth)
 Louie Clemente (Testament)
 Tommy Clufetos (Ozzy Osbourne, John 5)
 Scott Columbus (Manowar)
 Ricardo Confessori (Angra)
 John Connolly (Pierce Dogs, Sevendust)
 Fred Coury (Cinderella)
 Shawn Crahan (Slipknot)
 Peter Criss (Kiss)
 Dave Culross (Malevolent Creation, Suffocation, Incantation)

D 
 Greg D'Angelo (White Lion, Greg Leon Invasion)
 Brann Dailor (Mastodon)
 Adrienne Davies (Earth)
 Bevan Davies (MonstrO)
 Daniel Davison (Underoath, Norma Jean)
 Ivan de Prume (White Zombie)
 Mikkey Dee (King Diamond, Motörhead, Scorpions)
 Jimmy DeGrasso (Alice Cooper, F5)
 Jean Dolabella (Sepultura, Paul Di'Anno)
 John Dolmayan (System of a Down)
 Gary Driscoll (Rainbow)
 Shawn Drover (Megadeth)
 Aynsley Dunbar (Whitesnake, UFO)
 Mario Duplantier (Gojira, Empalot)

E 
 Lester Estelle II (Pillar)
 Daniel Erlandsson (Arch Enemy)

F 
 Chris Fehn (Slipknot)
 Steve Felton (Mushroomhead)
 Frank Ferrer (Tool, Guns N' Roses)
 Ginger Fish (Marilyn Manson)
 Justin Foley (Killswitch Engage, Blood Has Been Shed)
 Brian James Fox (White Tiger, Silent Rage)

G 
 Greg Gall (Six Feet Under)
 Lance Garvin (Living Sacrifice, Soul Embraced)
 Jerry Gaskill (King's X)
 Pete Gill (Motörhead, Saxon)
 Aaron Gillespie (Underoath)
 Nigel Glockler (Saxon)
 Rocky Gray (Evanescence, Living Sacrifice, Soul Embraced)
 Matt Greiner (August Burns Red)

H 
 Chris Hakius (Sleep)
 Dave Haley (Psycroptic)
 Donnie Hamzik (Manowar)
 Andrew Haug (Contrive)
 Ian Haugland (Europe)
 Raymond Herrera (Fear Factory)
 Munetaka Higuchi (Loudness)
 Gene Hoglan (Fear Factory, Death, Testament, Dark Angel, Dethklok)
 Eldon Hoke (The Mentors, The Screamers)
 Dave Holland (Judas Priest)
 Gary Holland
 Luke Holland (The Word Alive)
 Steve Hughes (Nazxul)
 Will Hunt (Evanescence, Black Label Society)
 Tom Hunting (Exodus, Angel Witch)
 David Husvik (Extol)

I 
 Jorge Iacobellis (Hirax)
 Inferno (Behemoth)

J 
 Bobby Jarzombek (Riot)
 Per Möller Jensen (The Haunted, Nightrage)
 Dan Johnson (Back From Ashes, Brian "Head" Welch, Love and Death, Red, The Sammus Theory)
 Joey Jordison (Slipknot)

K 
 Stefan Kaufmann (Accept, U.D.O.)
 Johnny Kelly (Danzig, Type O Negative)
 Des Kensel (High on Fire)
 Derek Kerswill (Kingdom of Sorrow)
 Ontronik Khachaturian (System of a Down, KillMatriarch)
 Reno Kiilerich (Dimmu Borgir, Old Man's Child)
 David Kinkade (Borknagar)
 Sean Kinney (Alice in Chains)
 Ted Kirkpatrick (Tourniquet)
 Ben Koller (Converge)
 George Kollias (Nile)
 Chris Kontos (Machine Head, Testament, Attitude Adjustment)
 Jim Korthe (Phantasm, 3rd Strike)
 James Kottak (Kingdom Come, Warrant, Scorpions)
 Josh Kulick (Through the Eyes of the Dead)

L 
 Tim Lambesis (As I Lay Dying, Austrian Death Machine)
 Michel Langevin (Voivod)
 Shannon Larkin (Godsmack)
 Tony Laureano (God Dethroned, Angelcorpse)
 Jen Ledger (Skillet)
 Kam Lee (Massacre, Death)
 Tommy Lee (Mötley Crüe, Methods of Mayhem)
 Dennis Leeflang (Bumblefoot)
 Joe Letz (Combichrist)
 Dave Lombardo (Slayer)
 Sara Lee Lucas (Marilyn Manson)
 Shannon Lucas (Black Dahlia Murder, All That Remains)
 Ray Luzier (Korn)

M 
 Samantha Maloney (Mötley Crüe)
 Jordan Mancino (As I Lay Dying, Wovenwar)
 Mike Mangini (Dream Theater, Steve Vai, Annihilator, Extreme)
 Bryan Mantia (Godflesh, Guns N' Roses, Buckethead)
 Emilio Márquez (Possessed)
 Roy Mayorga (Stone Sour)
 Paul Mazurkiewicz (Cannibal Corpse)
 Nicko McBrain (Iron Maiden)
 Dave McClain (Machine Head)
 Linda McDonald (Phantom Blue, The Iron Maidens)
 Nick Menza (Megadeth, Marty Friedman)
 Davy Mickers (Stream of Passion)
 Joe Musten (Beloved, Advent)

N 
 Craig Nunenmacher (Crowbar, Black Label Society)

O 
 Phil Ondich (Black Label Society, Raging Slab)
 Nick Oshiro (Static-X, Seether)
 Shane Ochsner

P 
 Ian Paice (Deep Purple, Whitesnake)
 Tony Palermo (Papa Roach)
 Andy Parker (UFO)
 Vinnie Paul (Pantera, Hellyeah)
 Neil Peart (Rush)
 A. J. Pero (Twisted Sister)
 Roxy Petrucci (Madam X, Vixen)
 Scott Phillips (Alter Bridge, Creed)
 Simon Phillips (Judas Priest, Michael Schenker Group)
 Pinchface (Deli Creeps)
 Mike Portnoy (Dream Theater, Avenged Sevenfold)
 Cozy Powell (Rainbow, Michael Schenker Group, Whitesnake, Black Sabbath)
 Aquiles Priester (Angra, Hangar)
 Matt Putman (Living Sacrifice, Eso-Charis)

R 
 Herman Rarebell (Scorpions)
 Chris Reifert (Abscess, Death, Autopsy)
 Sean Reinert (Cynic)
 The Rev (Avenged Sevenfold)
 Blake Richardson (Between the Buried and Me)
 Joe Rickard (Red, In Flames)
 Scott Rockenfield (Queensrÿche)
 Derek Roddy (Hate Eternal, Nile)
 Alexei Rodriguez (3 Inches of Blood, Walls of Jericho)
 Bobby Rondinelli (Blue Öyster Cult, Rainbow)
 Morgan Rose (Sevendust)
 Aaron Rossi (Prong, Ministry)
 Ilan Rubin (Nine Inch Nails, Lostprophets)
 Phil Rudd (AC/DC)
 Jason Rullo (Symphony X)

S 
 Gar Samuelson (Megadeth)
 Matt "Skitz" Sanders (Terrorust)
 Neil Sanderson (Thousand Foot Krutch, Three Days Grace)
 Pete Sandoval (Morbid Angel)
 Christoph Schneider (Rammstein)
 Stefan Schwarzmann (Krokus, Accept)
 Seann Scott (Hellion)
 Shagrath (Dimmu Borgir)
 Jayson Sherlock (Horde, Mortification)
 Martin Marthus Škaroupka (Cradle of Filth)
 David Silveria (Korn)
 Eric Singer (Kiss, Black Sabbath)
 Chris Slade (AC/DC, Uriah Heep)
 Jesse Smith (Zao)
 Mike Smith (Suffocation)
 Travis Smith (Trivium)
 Matt Sorum (Velvet Revolver, Guns N' Roses)
 Jesse Sprinkle (Poor Old Lu, Demon Hunter)
 Jani Stefanovic (Renascent, Crimson Moonlight, Miseration)
 Barry Stern (Trouble, Zoetrope)
 Darrell Sweet (Nazareth)
 Robert Sweet (Stryper)
 Steven Sweet (Warrant, Plain Jane)
 Chad Szeliga (OurAfter, Breaking Benjamin)

T 
 Kevin Talley (Dååth, Six Feet Under, Dying Fetus)
 Donald Tardy (Andrew W.K., Obituary)
 Phil Taylor (Motörhead)
 John Tempesta (Exodus, Testament, White Zombie)
 Mike Terrana (Masterplan, Tarja Turunen)
 Brian Tichy (Foreigner, Whitesnake, Ozzy Osbourne)
 Themis Tolis (Rotting Christ)
 Scott Travis (Judas Priest)
 Matt Traynor (Blessthefall)

U 
 Lars Ulrich (Metallica)
 Jan Uvena (Iron Butterfly, Alice Cooper, Alcatrazz)

V 
 Stephen van Haestregt (Within Temptation, My Favorite Scar)
 Alex Van Halen (Van Halen)
 Matt Vander Ende (Defiance)
 Dirk Verbeuren (Soilwork, Scarve)
 Chris Vrenna (Marilyn Manson, Nine Inch Nails)

W 
 Britt Walford (Squirrel Bait)
 Ed Warby (Ayreon, Gorefest)
 Bill Ward (Black Sabbath)
 Ariën van Weesenbeek (Epica, God Dethroned)
 Gary Wehrkamp (Shadow Gallery, Ayreon)
 Mike Wengren (Disturbed)
 Steve West (Danger Danger)
 Brad Wilk (Rage Against the Machine, Audioslave)
 Victor Ray Wilson (Body Count)
 Simon Wright (AC/DC, Dio, UFO)
 Jay Weinberg (Slipknot)

Y 
 Tim Yatras (Lord)
 Tim Yeung (All That Remains, Hate Eternal, Morbid Angel, Vital Remains)

Z 
 Stix Zadinia (Steel Panther)
 Steve Zing (Mourning Noise, Samhain)
 Mark Zonder (Warlord)

Drummers, heavy metal
Musicians by instrument and genre